WKDF (103.3 FM, "103.3 Country") is a country music radio station from Nashville, Tennessee. WKDF is owned by Cumulus Media. The transmitter site is in Brentwood, Tennessee, and its studios are located in Nashville's Music Row district.

WKDF formerly broadcast one channel in the HD format: a simulcast of the analog (traditional) signal.

History
WKDF was first licensed, as WNFO-FM, in 1962 to the Hickory Broadcasting Corporation. It was the second commercial Nashville station to be assigned to 103.3 MHz, preceded by the original WSM-FM, which occupied this frequency from 1947 until its deletion in 1951.

Despite several FM stations already operating in Nashville at the time, receivers were not yet in widespread use, and the relatively few listeners were not enough to attract advertisers. WNFO-FM left the air sometime around 1965. WKDA, then one of the two Top 40-formatted stations in the market, began broadcasting on 103.3 MHz on January 1, 1967 as WKDA-FM.

In January 1970, WKDA-FM began playing album-oriented rock, aimed especially at Nashville's large college student population, first at night only, and, then, beginning in March concurrent with a format change of the AM to country, full-time, for about a year and a half. Afterward, in the daytime, the station employed a mix of rock and Top 40 music, while switching to hard and progressive rock at night, during most of the 1970s and early 1980s. As the FM format grew, it soon became the dominant station of the two, which eventually separated. For some years from the late 1970s and into late 1980s, "KDF" (as it was popularly known after its call sign officially changed to WKDF in late 1976) was the dominant station in the Nashville market as determined by the number of listeners reported by Arbitron, again thanks to its vast popularity among younger listeners. Although WKDF was challenged by competitor stations in the late 1980s into the mid-1990s, it continued to place first, second, or third with Arbitron during this period. After a short stint with a hard rock format from 1992 to 1993, WKDF's format shifted to an active rock format in 1993, then alternative rock in 1996. In February 1997, the format was changed again to adult album alternative, which led to a precipitous fall in ratings from third in the market to 13th.

After nearly 30 years of programming some form of rock, WKDF reformatted to country music on April 1, 1999, after continued ratings losses to competitor FM outlets, a move that shocked many longtime Middle Tennesseans. Originally going by the moniker "Music City 103", it reverted to using its call letters in branding beginning in 2001. In recent years, the playlist has featured a mixture of contemporary and classic country.

In September 2011, WKDF came under Cumulus ownership (as a result of the Cumulus acquisition of Citadel), and thus, is now a sister station to fellow Nashville country outlet WSM-FM.

On February 3, 2014, WKDF, along with nine other Cumulus-owned country music stations, rebranded to the "Nash FM" branding that had been employed previously only by New York City outlet WNSH.

On May 14, 2020, WKDF rebranded as "103-3 Country".

The station also provides network programming for Absolute Radio Country in the United Kingdom weekdays from 5-10PM (GMT).

On Monday, October 18, 2021, WKDF became the new home station for the Big D & Bubba morning show. The show was previously heard in Nashville on rival station WSIX-FM from 2003-2011.

Former logos

References

External links
WKDF official website

History of WKDA/WKDF by a former employee

KDF
Country radio stations in the United States
Cumulus Media radio stations
Radio stations established in 1962